Pejman is an Iranian Drama and Comedy series. The series is directed by Soroush Sehhat.

Storyline 
Pejman Jamshidi, a former player of the Iran national football team, plays his role as the former star of Persepolis. He plays a footballer who has not been able to find a team for the fourth consecutive season despite much effort.Nevertheless, Pejman is still in the mood for fame.He is looking for a team with his program manager, and in the process, interesting things happen to him and his program manager.

Cast 
 Pejman Jamshidi
 Sam Derakhshani
 Hushang Harirchiyan
 Bahareh Rahnama
 Shaghayegh Dehghan
 Bijan Banafshehkhah
 Farhad Aeesh
 Hooman Barghnavard
 Vida Javan
 Rambod Javan
 Gholamhussein Lotfi
 Behnam Tashakkor
 Peyman GhasemKhani
 Farkhondeh Farmanizadeh
 Ardeshir Kazemi
 Amir Hossein Rostami
 Parvin Meykadeh
 Ali Oji
 Ashkan Khatibi
 Gelareh Darbandi
 Hamid Derakhshan, Behrouz Rahbarifar, Ali Mousavi, Mohammad Mohammadi, Arash Borhani, Hossein Mahini and Khosro Heydari are among the football players who have played their roles in this TV series.

References

External links
 

2010s Iranian television series
Iranian television series